Hieronim Ignacy Czarnowski (January 1834 – 28 December 1902) was a Polish chess master and activist.

He lived in Warsaw (then Russian Empire), where he played, among others, with Alexander Petrov and Szymon Winawer. After the failure of the January Uprising (1863–64), he emigrated to France.

In 1867, he took 8th in Paris (Ignaz von Kolisch won),
and won at Café de la Régence in Paris. He won a match against Préti (+3 –0 =1).

In 1880, he came to Cracow (then Austro-Hungarian Empire) in the period of Galician autonomy. He was a co-founder and a president of the Cracovian Chess Club (Krakowski Klub Szachistów) (1893), where he won a championship in 1897.

References 

1834 births
1902 deaths
Polish chess players
French chess players
Sportspeople from Warsaw
Emigrants from the Russian Empire to Austria-Hungary
19th-century chess players